Jani Sullanmaa (born 19 December 1981 in Hyvinkää) is a Finnish curler. He currently plays third for Aku Kauste.

Sullanmaa played juniors for Tuomas Vuori as his third. He won a silver medal at the 2003 Junior "B" World Championships followed up with a 9th-place finish at the 2003 World Junior Curling Championships.

Sullanmaa would then join Markku Uusipaavalniemi's team. He first played as the team's alternate and moved to second position after the 2006 Winter Olympics. At the Olympics, Sullanmaa won a silver medal as a member of the team.

External links
 

1981 births
Living people
People from Hyvinkää
Finnish male curlers
Curlers at the 2006 Winter Olympics
Olympic curlers of Finland
Olympic silver medalists for Finland
Olympic medalists in curling
Medalists at the 2006 Winter Olympics
Continental Cup of Curling participants
Sportspeople from Uusimaa
21st-century Finnish people